Sitnikov is a surname. Notable people with the surname include:

 Vasily Sitnikov (1915–1987), Russian painter
 Alexei Sitnikov (born 1986), Russian figure skater